Eugenio Mier y Concha Campos (born 25 December 1949) is a Mexican politician affiliated with the Institutional Revolutionary Party. He served as Deputy of the LIX Legislature of the Mexican Congress representing Tabasco, and previously served as municipal president of Nacajuca Municipality.

References

1949 births
Living people
Politicians from Tabasco
Members of the Chamber of Deputies (Mexico)
Institutional Revolutionary Party politicians
Universidad Juárez Autónoma de Tabasco alumni
21st-century Mexican politicians
Municipal presidents in Tabasco